Jason Thomas Berken (born November 27, 1983) is an American former professional baseball pitcher. He has played in Major League Baseball (MLB) for the Baltimore Orioles and Chicago Cubs.

College
Berken graduated from West De Pere High School. He played college baseball for the Clemson Tigers. While at Clemson, he played for the New England Collegiate Baseball League's Keene Swamp Bats. In 186 innings with Clemson, Berken pitched to an 18–6 record, 3.04 ERA, and 156 strikeouts.

Professional career

Baltimore Orioles
Berken was drafted by the Baltimore Orioles in the sixth round (175th overall) of the 2006 MLB draft. On May 26 2009, after pitching just 25 innings for Triple-A Norfolk, he was called up to the Orioles' roster to replace injured outfielder Lou Montanez. Berken earned his first major league win that day, giving up two runs in five innings in a 7–2 victory over the Toronto Blue Jays. However, he finished the year with a 6–12 record, along with a 6.54 ERA in 119 innings pitched. This led to Berken being named the "AL Les Sweetland Award winner" by SI writer Joe Posnanski for finishing the year as the worst starting pitcher in the American League.

Chicago Cubs
On September 7 2012, Berken was claimed off waivers by the Cubs. On September 20, Berken recorded four strikeouts in an inning.

Chicago White Sox
On April 2 2013, Berken signed as a minor league free agent with the Chicago White Sox for 2013 season.

San Francisco Giants
On November 15 2013, Berken signed a minor league contract with the San Francisco Giants. On March 31 2014, he was assigned to the Triple-A Fresno Grizzlies.

Philadelphia Phillies
On February 24 2015, Berken signed a minor league deal with the Philadelphia Phillies. On March 2 2015, he was assigned to the Triple-A Lehigh Valley IronPigs. He elected free agency on 6 November.

Toronto Blue Jays
On February 17 2016, Berken signed a minor league contract with the Toronto Blue Jays. He became a free agent on 7 November 2016.

See also
 List of Major League Baseball single-inning strikeout leaders

References

External links

1983 births
Living people
Baltimore Orioles players
Chicago Cubs players
Baseball players from Wisconsin
Major League Baseball pitchers
Aberdeen IronBirds players
Frederick Keys players
Bowie Baysox players
Norfolk Tides players
Charlotte Knights players
Fresno Grizzlies players
Sportspeople from Green Bay, Wisconsin
Clemson Tigers baseball players
Lehigh Valley IronPigs players